Mujer Sola is the fifth studio album of Puerto Rican singer Ednita Nazario. It was originally released by Borinquen Records on LP, 8 Track and Cassette in 1978. The album marked her first one with Laureano Brizuela as a producer and includes early hits like “Mío”, “Encuentro”, “Mujer Sola” and “Estoy Bien Junto A Ti”. It was re-released on digital platforms and CD for the first time in February 2020.

Track listing
 "Mujer Sola"
 "Minuetto"
 "Un Amor Más"
 "Corre Corre...No Te Enamores"
 "Amor De Ayer"
 "Encuentro"
 "Mío (Linda)"
 "Así Es El Amor"
 "Estoy Bien Junto A Tí"
 "Me Amabas, Te Amaba"

Personnel
 Produced by Laureano Brizuela

Ednita Nazario albums
1978 albums